Gosbat is a town in northeastern Algeria.

References 

Communes of Batna Province
Batna Province